The Aleksandrovska University Hospital is a university hospital in Sofia, the capital of Bulgaria. It was founded in 1879 and was named after the Bulgarian Prince Alexander I Battenberg in October 1884. A military hospital between 1912 and 1919, it was the site where the Sofia Medical University was founded in 1917.

External links
 

Hospitals in Bulgaria
Hospitals established in 1879
Buildings and structures in Sofia
1879 establishments in Bulgaria
Medical University, Sofia